Filterheadz are a techno DJ and production duo from Leuven, Belgium. Formed by brothers Bert and Maarten Wilmaers.

History 
In the mid-1980s, the Filterheadz made their first musical steps by playing in a pop band. Bert played guitar, Maarten was a drummer. Their role models were bands such as U2, The Police and Simple Minds, and still today these influences are audible in their songs.

After a whole series of pop, rock, metal and R&B projects with rather modest success, they continuously approached the field of electronic dance music through remixes by Roger Sanchez, Masters at Work and David Morales. Therefore, their recent productions are strongly oriented towards the American House scene.

In 1998, they were contracted by the Belgian label Headroom Music. After a few publications under various pseudonyms, they decided to opt for the name "Filterheadz". At that time, Jo Casters' attention was raised and he ordered a number of remixes from them. Their interpretation of "Struggle for Pleasure" (Minimalistix) became a club hit. Inspired by Deep Dish and John Digweed, they advanced to progressive trance and with remixes for Hooj and Platypus scored more club hits.

When the Filterheadz were contacted by Intec Records, they produced a Latin Techno track "Sunshine", which was to be played on Ibiza as a summer song. More remix work for Green Velvet, Bedrock, Eddie Amador, Tiësto and Oliver Lieb followed.

After producing the best-selling techno record of the year, they began to search musical diversity again and published their first mixed genre CD "Tribalicious". The first album is in progress and will be a mixture of Electronic Music and Independent.

Discography

Singles
2000 'Party With You' (as Slow)
2000 'Feel Your Body' (as TFF)
2001 'Faggots and Dope'
2001 'The Music'
2002 'The One Who Got Caught'
2002 'The Rhythm/Protection' (feat. Tomaz)
2002 'I Love Techno (United As One)' (as Tomaz vs. Filterheadz)
2002 'I Love Sunshine' (as Tomaz vs. Filterheadz)
2003 'In Your Eyes' with Orange 3
2003 'Lake T'ana' (as Slow)
2003 'Tribalicious'
2003 'Corridor' (as Zzino vs. Filterheadz)
2004 'Yimanya'
2005 'Love Distortion'
2005 'Cartagena/Santiago/Lima'
2005 'Switch'
2006 'Endless Summer'
2006 'Blue Sky Happiness'
2008 'Day At the Beach'
2009 'Rising Rocky'
2011 'Everything Explained'
2012 'The Game'
2012 'Earth'
2013 'Atlantic'
2013 'This And That'

Remixes
1999 After Sun - "Lovers"
2000 Spectre - "Intoxification" (Pro-Sync v. Filterheadz)
2000 Eggs & Bacon - "Moonlight Shining"
2000 Minimalistix - "Struggle for Pleasure"
2000 Master & Slave - "Time of Your Life"
2001 Star - "Rock Rose"
2001 Minimalistix - "Close Cover/Close But Undercover"
2001 Ashtrax - "Digital Reason"
2001 Murcielago - "Los Americanos"
2001 Minimalistix - "Into the Trees"
2001 Sonorous - "Glass Garden"
2001 Miss K. vs. Woody Rivers - "Touched Together" (Filterheadz vs. Pro-Sync Remix)
2001 Dave Kane - "The Journey of Zoé"
2001 Minimalistix - Firewalkers
2001 DJ Sandy vs. Sinesweeper - "Shake It"
2002 Antiloop - "Start Rockin'"
2002 Minimalistix - "Into the Streets"
2002 Praga Khan - "Glamour Girl"
2002 Bedrock - "Emerald"
2002 Ralphie B - "Massive"
2002 DJ Georgio presents Scramjet - "Into Tha Groove"
2002 Sylver - "Livin' My Life"
2002 Tiesto & Junkie XL - "Obsession"
2002 Barraka - "Song To The Siren"
2002 Oliver Lieb - "Subsonik"
2002 Richi M - "Face the Future"
2002 QED - "Hardly A Day"
2003 Minimalistix - "Magic Fly"
2003 Roc Project feat. Tina Arena - "Never"
2003 Roc Project feat. Tina Arena - "Never" (Tiësto Remix vs. Filterheadz Remix)
2003 Ashtrax - "Digital Reason"
2003 Air Bureau - "Coloured Reasons"
2003 Whatever, Girl! - "Activator (You Need Some)"
2003 Pierre Ravan & Safar - "Divine Energy"
2003 Eddie Amador - "House Music"
2003 DJ Preach - "Against Winter (Filterheadz Re-work)"
2003 Dallas Superstars - "I Feel Love"
2003 Kira - "I'll Be Your Angel"
2003 Robbie Rivera - "Sex"
2003 Vek - "Can't Get It"
2003 The Attic - "I Just Can't Help It"
2004 Eric Prydz - "Call On Me"
2004 Faithless - "I Want More"
2004 Dido - "Sand In My Shoes"
2004 Delerium feat. Sarah McLachlan - "Silence"
2004 Tranquility Base - "Surrender"
2005 Housetrap - "Freak"
2005 End-Jy - "Tango"
2006 Marcel Woods - "Advanced"
2006 Steve Porter - "1990"
2006 Tom Tom Le Chevalier & Anita Kelsey - "Never Ever"
2006 Johan Gielen - "Revelations"
2006 M.I.K.E. - "Strange World 2006"
2007 Regi - "I Fail"
2007 Michal Poliak - "World Republic"
2007 Minimalistix - "Whistling Drive (Aka Young Folks)"
2008 Schossow* & Sagstad - "Svamptramp"
2008 Sia - "Buttons"
2008 Boss@Nova - "I Wanna Be Your Dog"
2008 Chainside - "I Would Die For You"
2008 O.C. - "The Sleep Routine D.P."
2008 Simon Patterson - "Different Feeling"
2009 Marco Bailey - "Muzika"
2014 Dimitri Vegas & Like Mike - "CHATTEHOOCHEE"

References

External links 
 Filterheadz's home page

Techno music groups
Belgian electronic music groups
Belgian dance music groups
Belgian DJs
Belgian musical duos
Electronic dance music DJs